"Fallout" is the fourth single by Welsh indie rock band Catfish and the Bottlemen. The song was included in their debut studio album, The Balcony. The single was digitally released on 7 July 2014. The single did not contain a B-side.

The song was the first single by the band to chart in Belgium, reaching number 92 in the Ultratop chart.

Track listing

Charting

References

External links 
Fallout - Single at Discogs
Lyrics of this song - Fallout

2014 singles
2013 songs
Catfish and the Bottlemen songs
Island Records singles
Song recordings produced by Jim Abbiss